Tina Pan (born 31 March 1957) is a Taiwanese politician. She was a member of the Legislative Yuan from 1993 to 2002 and again between 2005 and 2016.

Education
Pan earned a doctorate in political science at National Taiwan Normal University.

Electoral history
She served on the Taipei County Council from 1982 to 1993, when she first won election to the Legislative Yuan. Pan ran in the 2001 elections, but lost. She returned to the Legislative Yuan from 2005 to 2016. Having represented Taipei for most of her legislative career, Pan was placed on the Kuomintang proportional representation party list starting in 2007 and again in 2011. She stated in February 2017 that supporters had pushed her to explore a campaign for the Kuomintang leadership election scheduled for May. Pan confirmed her candidacy for the position later that month. She placed sixth in the election, with 2,437 votes.

Political stances
Pan is the longtime chairwoman of the Modern Women's Foundation. She is also active in the National Women’s League. Pan supports a gradual elimination of prostitution in Taiwan, and voted for a 2011 bill legalizing the sex trade in red-light districts so that women who participate in designated areas would not face prosecution. She also backed the Family Proceedings Act, which sought to speed up family law-related court cases to protect women and children. Pan has proposed many amendments to the Sexual Assault Crime Prevention Act and believes that DNA sampling used as evidence for such legal proceedings should be applied to other cases. She views chemical castration as a form of therapy and opposes its proposed inclusion in the Sexual Assault Crime Prevention Act as a punishment.

Pan has worked to expand the rights of immigrants to Taiwan throughout her legislative career. She attempted to lessen the waiting time required for Chinese spouses of Taiwanese nationals to seek permanent residency in Taiwan. She was critical of the Government Information Office which in 2006 researched a ban of soap operas produced in Japan, Korea, China and Hong Kong. In 2014, Pan assisted Joseph Levy, a French citizen who was born in Taiwan, with his application to Taiwan's merchant marine.

References

External links

 

1957 births
Living people
Politicians of the Republic of China on Taiwan from Pingtung County
Taipei Members of the Legislative Yuan
National Taiwan Normal University alumni
Party List Members of the Legislative Yuan
Kuomintang Members of the Legislative Yuan in Taiwan
Taiwanese feminists
20th-century Taiwanese women politicians
Taipei City Councilors
New Taipei City Councilors
21st-century Taiwanese women politicians
Members of the 6th Legislative Yuan
Members of the 2nd Legislative Yuan
Members of the 3rd Legislative Yuan
Members of the 4th Legislative Yuan
Members of the 8th Legislative Yuan
Members of the 7th Legislative Yuan